The Three Bards are the national poets of Polish Romantic literature. They lived and worked in exile during the partitions of Poland which ended the existence of the Polish sovereign state. Their tragic poetical plays and epic poetry written in the aftermath of the 1830 Uprising against the Russian rulership, revolved around the Polish struggle for independence from foreign powers.

Meaning

Wieszcz means prophet or soothsayer in the Polish language. Therefore, the Three Bards were thought to not only voice Polish national sentiments but also to foresee the nation's future. The term Three Bards is almost exclusively used to denote Adam Mickiewicz (1798–1855), Juliusz Słowacki (1809–1849) and Zygmunt Krasiński (1812–1859). Of the three, Krasiński is considered the least influential. 

In a rough classification of the members of this triad, Mickiewicz, the master of the epic and lyric, may be called the poet of the present; Krasiński, the prophet and seer, the poet through whom the future spoke; while Słowacki, the dramatist, was the panegyrist of the past.

History

The concept of a bard was a Polish approximation of the Ancient Latin term poeta vates, denoting a poet to whom the gods granted the ability to foresee the future. Imported to Poland in the 16th century along with many other Sarmatist ideas, initially the term wieszcz was used to denote various poets. However, with the advent of Romanticism in the 19th century, the term started to be applied almost exclusively to denote Adam Mickiewicz, Juliusz Słowacki and Zygmunt Krasiński. Though the poets did not form a particular poetic group or movement, all of them started to be seen as moral leaders of a nation deprived of political freedom. They also often used the local folklore, which somehow linked the term wieszcz with folk wisemen, often found in legends and folk tales.

The Fourth Bard 
After the failed second revolt against the Russian Empire known as the January Uprising, and especially in the 1870s, the term was used only to denote the three mentioned poets. However, in the early 20th century the rediscovery of the works of Cyprian Kamil Norwid (1821–1883) gained him the name of the fourth bard. Some literary critics of the late 20th-century Poland were skeptical as to the value of Krasiński's work and considered Norwid to be the Third bard instead of Fourth. Other literary critics mainly from between the World Wars claimed Stanisław Wyspiański to be the fourth. However, the group referred to as the bards or wieszcze almost always consists of only three out of five candidates.

See also
 National poets
 Polish messianism
 Romanticism in Poland
 Tymon Zaborowski—also known as "Wieszcz Miodoboru ("the Bard of the Honey Harvest")

Notes and references

Polish poets